John Louis Sullivan (May 10, 1938 – November 27, 2010) was an American football player and coach. He served as the head football coach at Simpson College in Indianola, Iowa from 1966 to 1970, compiling a record of 30–11–3. He was also instrumental in reviving the football program at Ellsworth Community College in Iowa Falls, Iowa.

Sullivan then became a teacher after his football career.

Head coaching record

College

References

1938 births
2010 deaths
Northern Iowa Panthers football players
Simpson Storm football coaches
People from Spencer, Iowa
Players of American football from Iowa
Coaches of American football from Iowa